Andrey Yuryevich Tatarinov  (born on 6 June 1988) is a Russian politician, social activist, journalist and Director of Center for Policy relevance. In 2010–2012 — member of the Public Chamber of the Russian Federation.

Biography
Born on 6 June 1988 in Moscow, he became a student at the Russian State Social University. Previously he studied at the Faculty of Journalism at Lomonosov Moscow State University and the Griboyedov Institute of International Law and Economics.

He is married with one son.

Until 2006 he was a political journalist. In 2004–2005 — freelance correspondent of "Society", "Izvestia" was preparing reports from political action. In 2005 he passed training on channel 3 in the wording of the "Russian view". In 2005–2006 - columnist of newspaper "Zavtra" (Tomorrow) (Editor — Alexander Prokhanov), wrote under the pseudonym "Andrey Sadov".

Under the same pseudonym in 2004–2006 was a member of a number of opposition organizations (NBP, youth "Yabloko" (Apple)).

Then he became the leader of the Youth Human Rights Movement "Leviy Povorot" (left turn) in the first action which he had burned NBP party ticket. On street protests he repeatedly has had detained by riot police.

In 2006–2010 — first active participant, then one of the leaders of the NGO "Young Guard of United Russia". According to Tatarinov, in spring 2006 he was invited to MGER by Demidov Ivan, while  he was coordinator of Young Guard ideology. Worked as a political technologies in the Central Headquarters (CH) of Young Guard. December 12, 2006, at the II Congress Young Guard he became a member of the Political Council, was re-elected until 2010. Headed the Political Department in CH at Young Guard, engaged in the creation of similar structures in the regional offices. April 13, 2010, in Grozny at the first meeting of the Coordinating Council in the North Caucasus Federal District Young Guard elected him official representative in central headquarters of Young Guard. In autumn 2010, before the IV Congress Young Guard considered one of the leading candidates for the role of the new leader of the organization. At the congress on December 22, was elected to the Coordinating Council. He called Anna Chapman, which at the same time became a member of the Public Council of Young Guard,  "an example of unconditional patriotism". In the future Andrey Tarasov took no public participation at Young Guard actions.

In 2007 participated in the "Russian Club".

In 2007–2008 — deputy head of the Federal Youth election headquarters of "United Russia", who worked for the election of deputies of the State Duma and the Russian President.

In 2008, after the Georgian-Ossetian conflict in August 2008 — the organizer of the information campaign "I am telling the truth about Tskhinvali".

In 2008–2009 — the organizer of the campaign Young Guard "Our money to our people" against illegal immigration. Protest began after the announcement of the planned increase in FMS quotas for foreign labor in Russia. 1 November 2008, Young Guard pickets passed in front of the FMS and offices of a number of construction companies. The representatives of DPNI tried to join to action, but their appearance is called provocation. December 4, Vladimir Putin stated the need reduce the allowance twice and 5 December gave appropriate instructions to FMS. Tatarinov called it one of the victories of Young Guard. December 8 FMS picketing resumed under the slogan "FMS, do not brake!". On December 8, International Migrants Day Young Guard held sticker-campaign "Every second - go home" and announced the creation of joint raids with FMS. January 19, 2009, in Moscow at the Kazan station Young Guards met trains from Central Asia with posters "Work legally!" and "Illegal - the thief". The activists of Young Guard have been threw eggs and ink bubbles by activists of "Autonomous Action".

Tatarinov repeatedly opposed gay parades. In 2008, the portal gayrussia.eu led collection of his quotations, that are in the opinion of the editorial board, are homophobic.

In 2009–2010 — the organizer of the project "My Story" (in defense of historical memory, against historical revisionism). The first meeting of the project occurred on 22 June 2009, the Day of Memory and Mourning in Moscow. Later during the year repeatedly held action at the embassies of Ukraine, Latvia, Estonia and Poland.

On 17 November 2009, he organized a protest against the demolition of the wall in memory of Viktor Tsoi on Old Arbat Street, which planned by Moscow Central Administrative Okrug Prefecture. After the action the city authorities refused his plan.

From 2010 to 2012 - Member of the Public Chamber of the third composition. Was a member of several committees: on the development of civil society (with decisive vote) on International Relations and Freedom of conscience, on Regional Development and Local Government (in an advisory capacity). Entered into an inter-commission working group on child and youth policy.

Was part of a group of observers during the second round of Ukrainian presidential election in February 2010.

In February 2010, in Chisinau at the Russian Diaspora "round table" in Moldova, dedicated to the problems of historical falsifications, opposed the creation of the country's special commission of inquiry and evaluation of the crimes of totalitarian communist regime.

On 3 June 2010, he issued a statement condemning the position of the Human Rights Commissioner of Russia Vladimir Lukin, announced the suspension of cooperation with the Ministry of Internal Affairs due to arrests  the shares of the "Strategy-31" on Triumph Square 31 May 2010.

In July 2010, supported the idea of the return the course of Basic military training in Moscow schools: "In our country, every young person should be able to keep guns in their hands and shoot straight out of it".

He was arrest on 1 November 2010 for participating in an unsanctioned rally at the Embassy of Japan, against Tokyo's reaction on the visit of Russian President Dmitry Medvedev to the Kuril Islands.

On 8 November 2010, Andrey Tatarinov urged not to link Young Guard with the attack on Oleg Kashin occurring November 6: "Don't represent our political debate as an excuse for criminality. We wish a speedy recovery to Oleg and return to the system". A day later, at an extraordinary joint session of three specialized commissions of the Public Chamber has suggested not to use the situation for political gain Yevgenia Albats, due to attacks by "climate of intolerance in society created by pro-Kremlin youth organizations" and demanded the resignation of Vasily Yakemenko, the head of Federal Agency for Youth Affairs "Rosmolodezh".

In January 2011, has become one of the signatories of the manifesto for the establishment of Lev Gumilev Center (document was also signed by the philosopher Alexander Sekackii, Avraham Shmulevich publicist, writer Roman Bagdasarov and others).

In 2011 — one of the coordinators of the art community "Grouping of changes / Angry artists" , was acting in St. Petersburg.

On 4 December, after the polls closed on election to the State Duma art community organized on the Blue Bridge Saint Isaac's Square street theater performance "Antibes", based on the novel "The Possessed" by Dostoyevsky and supported by Sergei Bugaev Afrika and the Faculty of Arts of Saint Petersburg State University (Dean — Valery Gergiev). Another  action art community entered top the most unusual urban socio-political action  according of "MK in St. Petersburg".

In September 2011 called the arrest and detention in Chisinau writer Eduard Bagirov on charges of organizing mass riots April 7, 2009 "Russia's answer for Natalia Morar and the Moldovan government  sworn West".

On the eve  of the opposition rally of 10 December 2011, at the Bolotnaya Square in Moscow "Novaya Gazeta", citing "informed sources from among the activists" Tatarinov named among those who are preparing provocations by the Young Guard, in particular, "shouting slogans for Putin and acting authority to deploy the appropriate placards and tricolors". Tatarinov has denied this: "from working in Young Guard departed, and doing the work of the Public Chamber".

On the 2012 Russian presidential election was the executive secretary of the Coordinating Council Headquarters of United Action, organized in support of Putin's movements "Mestnye", "Young Russia", "New People" and "Grouping of Change". Headquarters of united action announced a white glove as its symbol, as opposed to the white ribbon, which has become a symbol of the protest movement in Russia. February 7 Tatarinov addressed an open letter to Ksenia Sobchak, in which he said that "people on the stage conditional "Bolotnaya" have nothing to do with the values that are associated with your surname". On election night, Headquarters of United Action held a rally on Lubyanka Square. On the morning of February 20 the filing notice of this meeting has been accompanied by clashes with opposition representatives in Moscow Mayor's Office.

In 2013 — columnist of the newspaper "Moscow News", online newspaper "Vzglyad" (Sight).

Since December 2013 at the media acts as a director of the policy relevance.

References

External links
Official site of Andrey Tatarinov 
Blogs of Andrey Tatarinov: at LJ, at Twitter 
BBC: Viewpoint: Pro-Putin cheerleader
Newsweek: Young Russians’ About-Face From the West
Interview for "Russian News Service" (RNS, lead — Dobrov Andrey S.)
Interview for program "Triangle" ("Channel 3", 09.12.2010)
Andrei Tatarinov in the program "Man and Law" (Channel One Russia, 21.05.2009, lead  — Alexey Pimanov)
Andrey Tatarinov blog on site of the Public Chamber of the Russian Federation (2010-2012 years) 
A.Tatarinov. About irresponsible politicians and unlucky businessmen. Shuum.ru 
Andrey Tatarinov's articles on site "Actual comments" (2009-2010) 
"Opinions" of Andrey Tatarinov on site "Russian Observer"
Articles by Andrey Tatarinov on Young Guard website (Archive 2008-2010) 
Articles by Andrey Tatarinov in the newspaper «Moskovskiye Novosti»

Politicians from Moscow
Russian activists
Living people
1988 births